WWKY-FM (104.9 FM) is a radio station licensed to Providence, Kentucky, United States. The station is currently owned by Caldwell County C.B.C., Inc.

History
The station went on the air as WPKY-FM on March 22, 1979. On January 15, 1994, the station changed its call sign to WAVJ.

The station broadcasts and streams Caldwell County High School Sports. Studios are in downtown Princeton at 108 West Main Street. Sports remain a primary concern for the station, although other possible topics have been making themselves known as of late. The station also broadcasts University of Kentucky Football and Basketball, as well as Tennessee Titans Football.

The station has been recognized on the local, state and national level for its efforts in the area of community service.

On April 1, 2013, WAVJ changed their format from adult contemporary to classic hits, branded as "104.9 The Wave".

On July 31, 2015, WAVJ went silent (off the air).

On August 1, 2015, WAVJ returned to the air with a simulcast of country-formatted WWKY 97.7 FM Providence, KY.

On July 20, 2016, WAVJ went silent.

On April 2, 2017, WAVJ returned to the air with a country format, branded as "104.9 Nash Icon".

On April 13, 2017, WAVJ changed callsigns to WWKY. On May 15, 2017, the station changed its call sign to WWKY-FM.

References

External links
WWKY-FM Facebook

WKY-FM
Radio stations established in 1979
1979 establishments in Kentucky
Country radio stations in the United States
Webster County, Kentucky